Dorcadion seoanei is a species of beetle in the family Cerambycidae. It was described by Graells in 1858.

Subspecies
 Dorcadion seoanei kricheldorffi Pic, 1910
 Dorcadion seoanei laurae Bahillo, 1993
 Dorcadion seoanei seoanei Graells, 1858

See also 
Dorcadion

References

seoanei
Beetles described in 1858